Bouneschlupp is a traditional Luxembourgish green bean soup with potatoes, bacon, and onions.

Although Bouneschlupp is considered a Luxembourgish national dish, it can also be found in Saarland (Germany), Gaume, Arelerland (Belgium), and Lorraine (France).

See also 
 List of bean soups
 Luxembourgian cuisine

References

External links 
 Recipe 1 for Bouneschlupp 
 Recipe 2 for Bouneschlupp 
 Recipe 3 for Bouneschlupp  
 Recipe 4 for Bouneschlupp 

Luxembourgian cuisine
Bean soups